The M578 light recovery vehicle (G309) was an American Cold War-era armored recovery vehicle. The M578 utilized the same chassis as the M107 self-propelled gun and M110 self-propelled howitzer. The M578 provided maintenance support to mechanized infantry and artillery units. Its primary mission was to recover damaged light armored vehicles from the battlefield using its crane boom.

History

In 1956 the US Army commissioned the Pacific Car & Foundry Company to design an undercarriage for a new series of self-propelled artillery systems that would be lighter, air transportable, and provide a common chassis for multiple vehicles. This would then become the M107 self-propelled gun and M110 self-propelled gun with the Army expanding the program in 1957 to include a field ambulance (T119) and an armoured light recovery vehicle (T120) with the T119 being dropped from the program during the prototype phase. The T120 went through testing starting in 1959, now being designated the T120E1 and was accepted for service after completing testing with production of the vehicle starting in late 1962 by FMC Corp. and would continue in production till the end of the 1960s. In 1975 production resumed under Bowen-McLaughlin-York (later United Defense Industries) with an additional 448 vehicles for the US Army between 1975 and 1977 at a cost of US$189,000 per vehicle, followed by export orders to other countries. In 1981 production would be discontinued permanently.

Vehicle Operation
The cab could rotate 360°, and had a 30,000 lb (13,600 kg) capacity winch which ran through a crane on the cab. Another winch, 60,000 lb (27,000 kg) capacity, was mounted on the front of the cab. Access to the cab was through a door on each side and by double doors in the rear, while the crane operator and rigger both had vision cupolas in the cab roof.

Operators
: Austrian Army - 22 vehicles sold from Netherlands to Austria in 1996, now out of service.
: Royal Bahraini Army - 2 vehicles sold from Netherlands to Bahrain in 1996.
: Bolivian Army
: Botswana Ground Force
: Brazilian Army - At least 17 vehicles in inventory, unclear if all the vehicles are still in service as of June 2022.
: Canadian Army - At least 50 vehicles had been in service and remained in inventory as of early 2008, which have since been retired from service.
: Royal Danish Army - 24 vehicles purchased during 1966–1970, no longer in service.
: Egyptian Army - At least 45 vehicles in inventory, unclear if all the vehicles are still in service as of June 2022.
: Hellenic Army - At least 113 vehicles in inventory, unclear if all the vehicles are still in service as of June 2022.
: Iranian army
: Israel Defense Forces
: Royal Jordanian Land Force
: Lebanese Armed Forces - At least 4 vehicles were provided as US aid during the early 1980s.
: Royal Moroccan Army - At least 86 vehicles in inventory, unclear if all the vehicles are still in service as of June 2022.
: Army of Peru
: Royal Netherlands Army - A total of 25 vehicles were purchased during three orders of 8 vehicles (1965), 12 vehicles (1966) and 5 vehicles (unknown), with all vehicles leaving service and being sold by the end of 1996.
: Norwegian Army
: Philippine Army
: Portuguese Army - 29 vehicles in service (21 vehicles in service since 1995, 8 vehicles since 1997).
: Saudi Arabian Army - At least 90 vehicles in inventory, unclear if all the vehicles are still in service as of June 2022.
: Spanish Army
: Turkish Army
: Royal Thai Army
: British Army
: United States Army - At least 448 vehicles were in service with the Army but the exact amount from the first production series is unclear as the information is still currently redacted as of June 2022.
: Army of the Republic of Vietnam
: People's Army of Vietnam
: Yemen Army

See also
 List of U.S. military vehicles by model number

References

 TM 9-2320-238 dated 1963-1964
 TM 9-2350-238 dated 1963-1962

External links
AFV Database

Armoured recovery vehicles of the United States
Tracked armoured recovery vehicles
Military vehicles introduced in the 1960s